Khalifehlu Kandi-ye Bozorg (also Romanized as Khalīfehlū Kandī-ye Bozorg; also known as Qeshlāq-e Khalīfehlū) is a village in Qeshlaq-e Sharqi Rural District, Qeshlaq Dasht District, Bileh Savar County, Ardabil Province, Iran. At the 2006 census, its population was 754, in 142 families.

References 

Tageo

Towns and villages in Bileh Savar County